Dejan Milićević, is a Serbian music video director and fashion photographer that has directed many music videos for many famous ex-Yugoslav musicians. He has also photographed many models, some of which were used as part of the Joni Peci collection. He had also photographed popular turbo-folk singer Svetlana "Ceca" Ražnatović, which were featured in an issue of the local Playboy magazine.

Personal life
In 2007, Milićević moved to Skopje, R. Macedonia. His secondary home is in Belgrade (as of 2010).

Music videos directed

Serbian / Croatian / Bosnian 
Ljubiću noćas by Edwin po
Poslednje veče by Dragana Mirković
Biće mi kako kad by Dragana Mirković
Danima by Dragana Mirković
Sama by Dragana Mirković
Ja uspomenu čuvam by Dragana Mirković
Ja imam te a ko da nemam te by Dragana Mirković
Evo dobro sam by Dragana Mirković
Pečat na usnama by Dragana Mirković
Nepoželjna by Dragana Mirković
Teci mi kroz vene by Dragana Mirković
Ljubi il ubij by Dragana Mirković
Danak ljubavi by Dragana Mirković
Depresivan dan by Dragana Mirković
Trovanje by Dragana Mirković
Ne bih ja bila ja by Lepa Brena
Metak Sa Posvetom by Lepa Brena
Vatra by Ana Nikolić
Još Jedna U Nizu by Mina Kostic
Grudi Ot Betona by Mina Kostic & Igor X
Arsenik by Dajana
Ne mogu godinama by Danijela Vranić
Znam by Deen and Žanamari Lalić
Tvrdoglava by Electra
Samo jedno reci mi by Extra Nena
Veštica iz Srbije by Funky G and Vrčak (in Serbian and Macedonian)
Biber i čokolada by Martin Vučić
Gaćice by Goga Sekulić
Gubim kontrolu by Goga Sekulić
Katastrofa by Goga Sekulić
Seksi biznismen by Goga Sekulić
Ludača by Jelena Karleuša
Preživeću by Jelena Karleusa
Slatka mala by Jelena Karleuša
Upravo oslavljena by Jelena Karleuša
Ljubi me by Kaliopi
Lepa a sama by Kaya
Budi me by Konstantin Tino Kaysharov and Stevan Tomašević
Gde sam grešila by Marina Visković
Čovek mog života by Mia Borisavljević
 by Neda Ukraden
Nije ti dobro (Girls Night) by Neda Ukraden and Clea&Kim
Neverna by Nikola Burovac
Crno i zlatno by Seka Aleksić
Ostrvo tuge by Selma Bajrami
Promjeni se by Selma Bajrami
Žena starija by Stoja
Beograd by Svetlana "Ceca" Ražnatović
Crveno by Svetlana "Ceca" Ražnatović
Dokaz by Svetlana "Ceca" Ražnatović
Fatalna ljubav by Svetlana "Ceca" Ražnatović
Neodoljiv, neumoljiv by Svetlana "Ceca" Ražnatović
Nevaljala by Svetlana "Ceca" Ražnatović
Nije monotonija by Svetlana "Ceca" Ražnatović
Znam by Svetlana "Ceca" Ražnatović
Tebe volim by Tamara Todevska, Vrčak and Adrian Gaxha
Incident by Tanja Savic
GOOOL by Tijana Dapčević
Sve je isto samo njega nema by Tijana Dapčević
Extra by Tina Ivanović
Imaš me u šaci by Željko Samardžić
Kako da ne by Mia Borisavljević
Moj Dragi by Anabela
 Zaborav by Ana Nikolic
Šef stanice by

Macedonian 
Neka patam / Нека патам by Bravo Band
Vo imeto na ljubovta / Во името на љубовта by Maja Pančeva
Jas / Јас by Maja Vukićević
Pod koža... / Под кожа... by Maja Vukićević
Priznavam / Признавам  by Maja Vukićević
Sakam da znam / Сакам да знам by Maja Vukićević
Deža vu / Дежа ву by Sanja and Daskal
Vo Ime Na Ljubovta / Во Име На Љубовта by Tamara Todevska, Vrčak and Adrian Gaxha
Belo zname / Бело знаме by Verica Pandilovska
Životot e / Животот е by Verica Pandilovska
Povtorno se zaljubuvam vo tebe / Повторно се заљубувам во тебе by Vlado Janevski

Albanian 
Tribalb by Adelina Ismaili
Kriza by Berkan
Maraton by Berkan
Mandarin by Bleona Qereti
Prapë se prapë by Gili and Sinan Vllasaliu
Xhepi by Korab Jetishi
Amerika by Lori
Another World by Nora Istrefi (in Albanian and English)
Ah, moj dashuria ime by Pirro Çako
Dashuri Mistike by Tamara Todevska, Vrčak and Adrian Gaxha
Hey! by Tuna

Bulgarian 
Otzad mini / Отзад мини by Emanuela
Taralezh / Таралеж by Emanuela
Rom-pom-pom / Ром-пом-пом by Emanuela
Mili moy angel moy / Мили мой ангел мой by Emanuela
Shte ti dam / Ще ти дам by Alisia
Cherno kafe / Черно кафе by Alisia
Imame li vrazka / Имаме ли връзка by Alisia
 / На кръгъл час by Alisia
Na parvo vreme / На първо време by Dzhina Stoeva
Piy edna studena voda / Пий една студена вода by Rumina
Kazah ti / Казах ти by Rumina
Nomer 2 / Номер 2 by Ivena
 / Като кученце by Ivena
Dats (Zvukat na lyatoto / Дъц (Звукът на лятото) by Ivena
Dva prasta / Два пръста by Ivena
Stayata / Стаята by Ivena
Neshto malko cherno / Нещо малко черно by Ivena
Nyama da ti pozvolya / Няма да ти позволя by Ivena
Zhenski nomera / Женски номера by Ivena
Bez garantsiya / Без гаранция by Ivena
Stiga veche / Стига вече by Djordan
Ne drug, a az / Не друг, а аз by Krum
Dokoga / Докога by Jina Stoeva

English language 
Scandalous by Bleona Qereti
Go, Never Come Back by Nora Poljoska
Let Me Love You by Tamara Todevska, Vrčak and Adrian Gaxha

Other 
The Queen of the Night by Andrea Demirović (in Spanish and English)
Vo Imya Lyubvi (in Russian) and Yoksun (in Turkish) by Tamara Todevska, Vrčak and Adrian Gaxha

References

External links 
Official MySpace profile
Official YouTube channel
Dejan Milicevic entering in Dvor Srbija

Serbian film directors
Year of birth missing (living people)
Serbian music video directors
Fashion photographers
Living people
Film people from Belgrade
Photographers from Belgrade
Film people from Skopje